The administrations of Asmara are the official administrative divisions of Asmara, the capital of Eritrea. Within the city, there are thirteen districts (Neous Zobas). These districts are administered under North, North-West, North-East, South-East, South-West, East, West and Central areas.

Districts

North
Acria District (Acria, Mehram Chira, part of Edaga Arbi, Adi Nefas, Durfo)
Abbashaul District (Abbashaul, Gheza Berhanu, part of Edaga Arbi, Hadish Adi)
Edaga Hamus District (Edaga Hamus, Haz Haz)

North-East
Arbaete Asmara District (Arbaete Asmara, Gheza Kenisha, Gheza Tanika, Medeber, Deposito, Biet Gheorgis)

North-West
May Temenai District (May Temenai, Seghen)
Paradiso District (Paradiso, Adi Sogdo, Adi Abeito)

South-West
Sembel District (Sembel & Sembel Residential Complex)

South-East
Godaif District (Godaif, Bargima, Kahawta)

Central
Maakel Ketema District (Souk, Central Zone, Tab'ah)

Western
Tiravolo District (Tiravolo, Kagnew Station/Denden Camp, Campo Volo)
Gejeret District (large (A'bay) Gejeret, small (Neish'toy) Gejeret)

Eastern
Gheza Banda District (Ziban Sinkey, Gheza Banda, Ferrovia, Mai Chehot)
Tsetserat District (Tsetserat, Enda German, Space, Biet Makae, Villaggio, Senita)

References
 Administrations of Asmara

Asmara
Subdivisions of Eritrea